Roy Johnson (born 2 July 1948) is a Bermudian boxer. He competed in the men's light welterweight event at the 1972 Summer Olympics.

References

1948 births
Living people
Bermudian male boxers
Olympic boxers of Bermuda
Boxers at the 1972 Summer Olympics
Place of birth missing (living people)
Light-welterweight boxers